The 2004 United States presidential election in Arizona took place on November 2, 2004, and was part of the 2004 United States presidential election. Voters chose 10 representatives, or electors, to the Electoral College, who voted for president and vice president.

Arizona was won by incumbent George W. Bush by 10.5%. Prior to the election, 12 news organizations considered this a state Bush would win, or otherwise considered as a safe red state. Neither major party tickets campaigned here in the fall election. Arizona hosted the third presidential debate on October 13, 2004, in the city of Tempe.

, this is the last time Arizona was won by a double-digit margin of victory. This was the first election in which any candidate won more than a million votes as well as in which Maricopa County cast more than a million ballots. Until 2016, this would be the last time Arizona voted to the left of Georgia or North Carolina. As of 2020, this is the last time Arizona voted to the right of Arkansas.

Primaries
 2004 Arizona Democratic primary

Campaign

Predictions
There were 12 news organizations who made state-by-state predictions of the election. Here are their last predictions before election day.

Polling

Throughout several polls taken in the state in 2004, just one showed Kerry leading. The final 3 pre-election polls showed that Bush was leading with 51% to Kerry's 43%.

Fundraising
Bush raised $3,196,692. Kerry raised $1,525,930.

Advertising and visits
Neither campaign advertised or visited this state during the fall campaign.

Analysis
The exit polls showed that Bush was the going to be the clear winner of the state, based on the fact that both Bush won among both genders. A major key factor was how 55% of the people thought the state economy was good, and 70% of those people voted for Bush. Also, 55% of the state approved of Bush.

The key to Bush's victory was winning the highly populated Maricopa County with almost 57%. However, Kerry did win portions of the state such as Arizona's 4th congressional district and Arizona's 7th congressional district and 4 counties. 50% of the voting age population came out to vote.

Results

Results by county

Results by congressional district
Bush won six of eight congressional districts.

Electors

Technically the voters of Arizona cast their ballots for electors: representatives to the Electoral College. Arizona is allocated 10 electors because it has 8 congressional districts and 2 senators. All candidates who appear on the ballot or qualify to receive write-in votes must submit a list of 10 electors, who pledge to vote for their candidate and his or her running mate. Whoever wins the majority of votes in the state is awarded all 10 electoral votes. Their chosen electors then vote for president and vice president. Although electors are pledged to their candidate and running mate, they are not obligated to vote for them. An elector who votes for someone other than his or her candidate is known as a faithless elector.

The electors of each state and the District of Columbia met on December 13, 2004, to cast their votes for president and vice president. The Electoral College itself never meets as one body. Instead the electors from each state and the District of Columbia met in their respective capitols.

The following were the members of the Electoral College from this state. All were pledged to and voted for George W. Bush and Dick Cheney.
 Linda Barber
 Malcolm Barrett
 Jim Click
 Cynthia J. Collins
 Webb Crockett
 Elizabeth Wilkinson Fannin
 Ross Farnsworth
 Ira A. Fulton
 Bernice C. Roberts
 Phillip Townsend

Notes

References

Arizona
2004
2004 Arizona elections